General Echols may refer to:

John Echols (1823–1896), Confederate States Army brigadier general
Oliver P. Echols (1892–1954), U.S. Army Air Forces major general
Robert L. Echols (born 1941), U.S. Army National Guard brigadier general